Charlton Island (Sivukutaitiarruvik) is an uninhabited island located in James Bay, Qikiqtaaluk Region, Nunavut, Canada.

Thomas James, who gave his name to James Bay, wintered here in 1631 and named the island after Prince Charles. The founders of Fort-Rupert (1668) must have seen it and Charles Bayly was nearly driven ashore here in 1674. Some time before 1679 Bayly proposed making Charlton Island a central depot and meeting place for the three posts around James Bay. This seems to have been done until 1685 or later. After the Hudson Bay expedition (1686) the French planned to send their prisoners there. Little is heard of the island until 1803.

About 1802 the North West Company acquired the brig , and placed it under Captain Richards, a former Hudson's Bay Company man, and John George McTavish, the younger brother of the Chief of Clan McTavish. In the summer of 1803 it left Montreal for Hudson Bay. At the same time a force under Angus Shaw left the Tadoussac area for James Bay. They met at Charlton Island in HBC territory and claimed the island for the NWC. They built Fort St. Andrews there and two forts at the mouths of the Moose River and Eastmain River. The purpose, in part, was to pressure the HBC into granting the NWC transit rights through Hudson Bay. What happened after that is not clear.

References

Islands of James Bay
Uninhabited islands of Qikiqtaaluk Region
Hudson's Bay Company trading posts in Nunavut
Former populated places in the Qikiqtaaluk Region